Leo Antero Lastumäki (28 December 1927 – 29 January 2012) was a Finnish actor, born in Liminka. He worked in theaters, films and on television, often collaborating with Spede Pasanen. Lastumäki worked as a freelancer from 1973. He died in Kemi, aged 84.

Selected filmography 

The Harvest Month (1956)
Komisario Palmun erehdys (1960)
Speedy Gonzales – noin 7 veljeksen poika (1970)
Uuno Turhapuro menettää muistinsa (1982)
Koirankynnen leikkaaja (2004)

References

External links 
 

1927 births
2012 deaths
People from Liminka
Finnish male film actors
20th-century Finnish male actors